M99 or M-99 may refer to:

Places
 M-99 (Michigan highway), a state highway in south central Michigan
 Messier 99, an unbarred spiral galaxy approximately 60 million light-years away in the constellation Coma Berenices
 M99 road (Johannesburg), Metropolitan route in the City of Johannesburg, South Africa

Rifles
 Barrett M99, a sniper rifle
 Zijiang M99, a Chinese anti-materiel rifle

Tranquilizer
 Etorphine (a.k.a. Immobilon or M99), a veterinary tranquilizer